Witherlea is a suburb to the south of Blenheim's central district.

The Blenheim hospital campus, which includes Wairau Hospital, is in Witherlea.

Omaka Cemetery has graves from early Pākehā settlement in the Wairau area.

Demographics

Witherlea had a population of 5,409 at the 2018 New Zealand census, an increase of 576 people (11.9%) since the 2013 census, and an increase of 846 people (18.5%) since the 2006 census. There were 2,115 households. There were 2,631 males and 2,775 females, giving a sex ratio of 0.95 males per female, with 987 people (18.2%) aged under 15 years, 741 (13.7%) aged 15 to 29, 2,409 (44.5%) aged 30 to 64, and 1,269 (23.5%) aged 65 or older.

Ethnicities were 90.0% European/Pākehā, 10.0% Māori, 2.1% Pacific peoples, 4.0% Asian, and 2.8% other ethnicities (totals add to more than 100% since people could identify with multiple ethnicities).

The proportion of people born overseas was 17.8%, compared with 27.1% nationally.

Although some people objected to giving their religion, 50.4% had no religion, 38.5% were Christian, 0.6% were Hindu, 0.2% were Muslim, 0.5% were Buddhist and 2.2% had other religions.

Of those at least 15 years old, 786 (17.8%) people had a bachelor or higher degree, and 831 (18.8%) people had no formal qualifications. The employment status of those at least 15 was that 2,172 (49.1%) people were employed full-time, 708 (16.0%) were part-time, and 81 (1.8%) were unemployed.

Education
Witherlea School is a coeducational contributing primary (years 1-6) school with a roll of  students as of

References

Suburbs of Blenheim, New Zealand
Populated places in the Marlborough Region